Vineet Kumar is an Indian actor from the National School of Drama, known for his works in Hindi, Telugu, and English language films and Television. His Hollywood assignments include Return to Rajapur with Lynn Collins; Bhopal: A Prayer for Rain with Martin Sheen and Mischa Barton. He has also appeared in a number of Telugu, Kannada, and Bhojpuri films. He received critical acclaim for his work in the Telugu film Vikramarkudu.

Personal life
He is younger brother of Bihar Cadre IPS officer Sunit Kumar.

Career
He has appeared in a number of Hindi films. These include Drohkaal, Kachche Dhaage, Aks, Yeh Dil, Soch and Shool. Apart from Bollywood movies, he has also worked on Hollywood assignments such as Return to Rajapur with Lynn Collins; Bhopal: A Prayer for Rain with Martin Sheen and Mischa Barton. He has also appeared in a number of Telugu, Tamil and Bhojpuri movies. He received critical acclaim for his work in the Telugu movie Vikramarkudu.

He received positive reviews for his work in Masaan and has been termed 'Brilliant' for his role as a professional cremator. Masaan was screened in the Un Certain Regard section at the 2015 Cannes Film Festival winning two awards.

Awards, honours and recognition
Vineet won the Best Actor in Negative Role (Jury) award for Jaana Na Dil Se Door at the 16th Indian Television Academy Awards (ITA) in 2016.

Filmography

Hindi films

Telugu films

Kannada films

Tamil films

Nagpuri films

English films

Television

Awards and nominations

References

External links

The Actor Factor Theatre Company

Indian male film actors
Indian male television actors
Living people
National School of Drama alumni
Male actors from Patna
Male actors in Hindi cinema
Male actors from Mumbai
20th-century Indian male actors
21st-century Indian male actors
Male actors in Telugu cinema
Male actors in Tamil cinema
Male actors in Kannada cinema
Year of birth missing (living people)